M E Torbett Ltd v Keirlor Motels Ltd (established 1984) 1 NZBLC 102,079 is a cited case in New Zealand regarding fraud being a factor in determining whether an exclusion clause is enforceable under the Contractual Remedies Act [1979].


Background
Torbett purchased a coffee lounge off Keirlor for $115,000. Torbett later found the business to be overstaffed, and while trying to downsize his staff, all his staff went on strike. Fed up with all this, he sold the business six months later for $103,000 and sued Keirlor for misrepresentation. Keirlor relied on the exclusion clause as their defense.

Held
The court held that there was misrepresentation, and awarded damages of $11,000.

See also
 Bird v Bicknell

References

High Court of New Zealand cases
New Zealand contract case law
1984 in New Zealand law
1984 in case law